Mir Afzal-e Vavsar (also Romanized as Mīr Afẕal-e Vāvsar; also known as Mīr Afẕal) is a village in Chahardangeh Rural District, Chahardangeh District, Sari County, Mazandaran Province, Iran. At the 2006 census, its population was 138, in 41 families.

References 

Populated places in Sari County